The Europe Zone was one of the two regional zones of the 1933 International Lawn Tennis Challenge.

24 teams entered the Europe Zone, with the winner going on to compete in the Inter-Zonal Final against the winner of the America Zone.

Great Britain defeated Australia in the final, and went on to face the United States in the Inter-Zonal Final. In the Qualifying Draw, Germany, Austria, Switzerland and Italy advanced to the 1934 Europe Zone main draw.

Draw

First round

Spain vs. Great Britain

Italy vs. Yugoslavia

Belgium vs. Austria

Denmark vs. Ireland

Hungary vs. Japan

Germany vs. Egypt

Netherlands vs. Poland

Second round

Greece vs. Romania

Czechoslovakia vs. Monaco

Great Britain vs. Finland

Italy vs. Austria

Ireland vs. Japan

Germany vs. Netherlands

Switzerland vs. South Africa

Norway vs. Australia

Quarterfinals

Czechoslovakia vs. Greece

Great Britain vs. Italy

Germany vs. Japan

Australia vs. South Africa

Semifinals

Great Britain vs. Czechoslovakia

Australia vs. Japan

Final

Great Britain vs. Australia

References

External links
Davis Cup official website

Davis Cup Europe/Africa Zone
Europe Zone
International Lawn Tennis Challenge